St. Andrew's Church, Skegby is a parish church in the Church of England in Skegby, Nottinghamshire.

The church is Grade II listed by the Department for Digital, Culture, Media and Sport as it is a building of special architectural or historic interest.

The Skegby War Memorial, to the left of the entrance to the Church, is Grade II listed by the Department for Digital, Culture, Media and Sport as it is of special architectural or historic interest.

History

The church is medieval, the north arcade dating from the 13th century It is set on a hill overlooking the village and is mentioned in the Domesday Book.

Parish Structure
The church is in a group of parishes which includes
St. Andrew's Church, Skegby
All Saints' Church, Stanton on the Hill
St. Katherine's Church, Teversal

See also
Listed buildings in Skegby

Gallery

Sources

Church of England church buildings in Nottinghamshire
Grade II listed churches in Nottinghamshire
13th-century church buildings in England